Ahmad Ibn Abolhasan Jāmi-e Nāmaghi-e Torshizi (born Namagh (now Kashmar), Persia, 1048 – died Torbat-e Jam, 1141) better known as Sheikh Ahhmad-e Jami or Sheikh Ahmad-i Jami or Sheikh Ahmad-e jam or Sheikh-e Jam or simply Ahmad-e Jam was a Persian Sufi, Sufi writer, mystic and poet . His mazar (tomb) is located in Torbat-e Jam.

His life
He was born in 1048 (441 A.H.) in Namagh (now Kashmar) near Torshiz in Khorasan, and counted Jarir Ibn Abdullah, a companion (Sahaba) of Prophet Mohammad as one of his ancestors.  His parents made their living by farming. Ahmad was tall of stature, strong and courageous; this and a reputation for gruffness led to sources referring to him as "the Colossal Elephant" (Zhandeh Pil). Medieval accounts describe him as having red hair, a wine-colored beard and dark-blue eyes.

Until the age of twenty-two (circa 1070 CE / 463 AH), Ahmad would attend drinking parties with a circle of profligate friends. Ahmad experienced a conversion to the religious life one night after witnessing the miraculous transformation of wine into grape juice. [The Colossal Elephant and his Spiritual Feats, Story 1, Story 74]. After this Ahmad withdrew from his circle of friends. He took up the life of a hermit and lived in seclusion for eighteen years, on the mountain of Nâmaq until about 1082 (475 A.H.), and then on the mountain of Bizd for the next six years until circa 1088 (481 A.H.). [The Colossal Elephant, Stories 9, 10 and 13]. At the age of forty he returned to society to guide the people and make wine-drinkers and sinners to repent. The earliest source about him, The Spiritual Feats of Sadid al-Din Muhammad al-Ghaznavi, gives him the honorific title "Shaykh al-Islam." According to Ghaznavi's Spiritual Feats, Ahmad-e Jâm was not at first appreciated by the people, but after several miraculous healings, his reputation spread and he attracted some followers (see Stories 13–15).

Ahmad settled down in Ma'd-âbâd and began training disciples and composing books and propagating his ideas. He also built a Friday mosque and a khâneqâh, or Sufi lodge. From his home in Ma'd-âbâd, he made many trips throughout Khorasan, including visits to the major cities of Herât, Nayshabur, and Marv, and to Bâkharz and Bastâm. He evidently won many converts from the villages outlying Jâm. Shaykh Ahmad's activity therefore stretched across a territory that triangulates the modern borders of eastern Iran, northern Afghanistan and southern Turkmenistan. [Colossal Elephant, introduction].

Poetry
Although his main field was writing Books, he also composed great poems during his life.
A sample of his poetry is:

چون تیشه مباش و جمله زی خود متراش
چون رنده ز کار خویش بی بهره مباش 
تعلــیم ز اره گیر در امــر معاش
چیزی سوی خود میکش و چیزی می پاش

Don't be like axe and don't offend anyone
Don't be useless like a plane
Just be like a saw in your life
Do something for yourself and something for others

His Works
Although the title of his books are in Arabic, all of them are written in Persian. They are about shariah and theology, with some of his most important books being:
Meftāh al Najāt – "The key of Redemption"
Konuz al Hekma – "The Treasure of Wisdom"
Seraj al Sāerin – "The Lamp of Pilgrims"

His Death 
After his death in 1141 the people of Ma'dabad (now Torbat-e Jam) buried him in the gate of the city and made a tomb for him in order that the people could come and use the mystical powers of the Sheikh after his death.

Impact 
He had a great influence on Jami, who chose his penname according to Sheikh Ahmad Jami's name (which is Jami).

See also 
 Torbat-e Jam
 Sufism

Footnotes

References 
 The Colossal Elephant and His Spiritual Feats: The Life and Legendary Vita of Shaykh Ahmad-e Jâm. Co-authored and translated by Franklin Lewis and Heshmat Moayyad (Costa Mesa: Mazda, 2004) 
 Sheikh Ahmad Jami Biography in Ahmad-e-Jam Website
 Jami Article in Aftab Website
 Ahamd-e Jam Entry in Loghatnaameh Website Dehkhoda Encyclopedia

External links 
 Sheikh Ahmad Jami in torbatjam.com
 Mazar of Sheikh Ahmad Jami Complex – (Persian)
 Download a Pdf version of Meftāh al Najāt – (Persian)
 Some photos from his Mazar on flickr

Sufi writers
People from Torbat-e Jam
Sunni Sufis
Hanafis
Maturidis
1048 births
1141 deaths
11th-century Iranian people
12th-century Iranian people
People from Kashmar